Come Next Spring is a 1956 American Trucolor movie directed by R. G. Springsteen, starring Ann Sheridan and Steve Cochran.

The theme song, "Come Next Spring", with music by Max Steiner and lyrics by Lenny Adelson, was performed by Tony Bennett. It was covered by Scott Walker on his 1968 album Scott 2. Steiner wrote the score for the film, reusing much of his work from Sergeant York.

Plot
Alcoholic Matt Ballot (Steve Cochran) abandoned his wife Bess (Ann Sheridan) and mute daughter Annie (Sherry Jackson) in Arkansas nine years ago. Now sober, he returns to discover Bess gave birth to a son, Abe (Richard Eyer), after he left. Bess grudgingly hires him as a handyman. Hytower (Sonny Tufts) wants to marry Bess and tries to make Matt jealous and picks a fight with him. Matt endears himself to his kids by defending them from wild pigs and a group of local bullies. He risks Annie's love by admitting that she was in the car when he drunkenly wrecked it. Although she was unhurt, she never spoke again. Annie embraces him. Matt later saves a child and Annie during an approaching tornado.

Bess is upset when Matt has a single drink at a dance to prove he can stop at just one drink. Matt rescues her when, overcome by emotion, she accidentally drives her truck into a river. Annie falls into an old mine shaft, but Matt rescues her. Bess finally admits she is back in love with Matt.

Cast
 Ann Sheridan as Bess Ballot
 Steve Cochran as Matt Ballot
 Walter Brennan as Jeffrey Storys
 Sherry Jackson as Annie Ballot
 Richard Eyer as Abraham Ballot
 Edgar Buchanan as Mr. Canary
 Sonny Tufts as Leroy Hytower
 Harry Shannon as Mr. Totter
 James Westmoreland as Bob Storys (as Rad Fulton)
 Mae Clarke as Myrtle
 Roscoe Ates as Shorty Wilkins
 Wade Ruby as Delbert Meaner
 James Best as Bill Jackson

Production
Steve Cochran formed Robert Alexander Productions after his actual first two names. Come Next Spring was his first film, written by Cochran's friend Montgomery Pittman and featuring Pittman's stepdaughter Sherry Jackson. Filmed in locations around Sacramento, Republic promised Cochran an "A Picture" release but released it as the lower half of a double feature.

References

External links

 
 

1956 films
1956 drama films
American drama films
Republic Pictures films
Films directed by R. G. Springsteen
Trucolor films
1950s English-language films
1950s American films